Mansour Hamzi (born 17 January 1992) is a Saudi football player. He currently plays as a winger for Damac . He scored the 1st Hat-trick on the first match of Saudi Professional League in the 2016–17 season

References

External links 
 

Living people
1992 births
Saudi Arabian footballers
Association football wingers
Al-Yarmouk FC (Saudi Arabia) players
Al-Faisaly FC players
Al-Fateh SC players
Al-Hazem F.C. players
Damac FC players
Saudi Professional League players